Diego Andrés Carrasco Muñoz (born May 25, 1995) is a Chilean footballer who currently plays for club Coquimbo Unido as a central defender or left-back.

Career

Coquimbo Unido
On 13 July 2013, Carrasco made his professional debut at the age of 18 years in a match from 2013–14 Copa Chile against Deportes Copiapó, playing ninety minutes. He always played along with the pirate team at the Primera B, the second highest level of Chilean football. 

On 2018 season, he became team captain and Coquimbo Unido became Primera B's champion getting the promotion to Primera División after defeating Deportes Puerto Montt. So this way, Carrasco earned his first professional title.

Universidad de Chile
On 3 January 2019, he joined Universidad de Chile on a deal for three years.

Return to Coquimbo Unido
He signed with Coquimbo Unido for the 2023 season.

Career statistics

Club

Notes

Personal life
He is nicknamed Experiencia (Experience) due to his career, having played many matches being a young player.

Honours

Club
Coquimbo Unido
 Primera B (2): 2014-C, 2018

References

External links
 
 Diego Carrasco at udechile.cl
 Diego Carrasco at WorldFootball

Living people
1995 births
People from Coquimbo
Chilean footballers
Coquimbo Unido footballers
Universidad de Chile footballers
O'Higgins F.C. footballers
Primera B de Chile players
Chilean Primera División players
Association football defenders